The Census (Confidentiality) Act 1991 is an Act of Parliament of the Parliament of the United Kingdom. It gained Royal Assent on 7 March 1991.

The Act amended Section 8 of the Census Act 1920 by replacing a subsection concerning penalties for the unlawful disclosure of personal information from the census.

The Act applies to Great Britain. Separate legislation in the form of the Census (Confidentiality) (Northern Ireland) Order 1991 exists for Northern Ireland.

See also
Census in the United Kingdom
Census (Amendment) Act 2000

External links

United Kingdom Acts of Parliament 1991
Acts of the Parliament of the United Kingdom concerning Great Britain
Censuses in the United Kingdom